The 2014 FIBA Intercontinental Cup was the 24th edition of the FIBA Intercontinental Cup for men's professional basketball clubs and the 23rd edition of the tournament being in the form of a true intercontinental tournament for clubs. The 2 game aggregate score tournament took place at the HSBC Arena in Rio de Janeiro, Brazil, on September 26 and September 28, 2014, in order to determine the world club champion. The tournament was contested between the 2013–14 season EuroLeague champions, Maccabi Electra, and the 2014 FIBA Americas League champions, Flamengo.

Series summary

Flamengo won the series by aggregate score 156-146.

Game 1

Game 2

Rosters

Referees

 Recep Ankarali
 Jorge Vázquez
 Daniel Hierrezuelo

Source:

MVP

 Nicolás Laprovíttola - ( Flamengo)

References

External links 
2014 Intercontinental Basketball Cup
2014 FIBA Intercontinental Cup Official Site
Microsite by FIBA Americas
Euroleague.net 2014 FIBA Intercontinental Press Conference

Intercontinental Cup (Basketball), 2014
FIBA Intercontinental Cup
International sports competitions in Rio de Janeiro (city)
2014–15 in Brazilian basketball
International basketball competitions hosted by Brazil
2014–15 in Israeli basketball